In differential geometry, the Gauss map (named after Carl F. Gauss) maps a surface in Euclidean space R3 to the unit sphere S2. Namely, given a surface X lying in R3, the Gauss map is a continuous map N: X → S2 such that  N(p) is a unit vector orthogonal to X at p, namely a normal vector to X at p.

The Gauss map can be defined (globally) if and only if the surface is orientable, in which case its degree is half the Euler characteristic. The Gauss map can always be defined locally (i.e. on a small piece of the surface). The Jacobian determinant of the Gauss map is equal to Gaussian curvature, and the differential of the Gauss map is called the shape operator.

Gauss first wrote a draft on the topic in 1825 and published in 1827.

There is also a Gauss map for a link, which computes linking number.

Generalizations

The Gauss map can be defined for hypersurfaces in Rn as a map from a hypersurface to the unit sphere Sn − 1  ⊆  Rn.

For a general oriented k-submanifold of Rn the Gauss map can also be defined, and its target space is the oriented Grassmannian 
, i.e. the set of all oriented k-planes in Rn. In this case a point on the submanifold is mapped to its oriented tangent subspace. One can also map to its oriented normal subspace; these are equivalent as  via orthogonal complement.
In Euclidean 3-space, this says that an oriented 2-plane is characterized by an oriented 1-line, equivalently a unit normal vector (as ), hence this is consistent with the definition above.

Finally, the notion of Gauss map can be generalized to an oriented submanifold X of dimension k in an oriented ambient Riemannian manifold M of dimension n. In that case, the Gauss map then goes from X to the set of tangent k-planes in the tangent bundle TM. The target space for the Gauss map N is a Grassmann bundle built on the tangent bundle TM. In the case where , the tangent bundle is trivialized (so the Grassmann bundle becomes a map to the Grassmannian), and we recover the previous definition.

Total curvature
The area of the image of the Gauss map is called the total curvature and is equivalent to the surface integral of the Gaussian curvature.  This is the original interpretation given by Gauss. The Gauss–Bonnet theorem links total curvature of a surface to its topological properties.

Cusps of the Gauss map

The Gauss map reflects many properties of the surface: when the surface has zero Gaussian curvature, (that is along a parabolic line) the Gauss map will have a fold catastrophe. This fold may contain cusps and these cusps were studied in depth by Thomas Banchoff, Terence Gaffney and Clint McCrory. Both parabolic lines and cusp are stable phenomena and will remain under slight deformations of the surface. Cusps occur when:
The surface has a bi-tangent plane
A ridge crosses a parabolic line
at the closure of the set of inflection points of the asymptotic curves of the surface.
There are two types of cusp: elliptic cusp and hyperbolic cusps.

References
Gauss, K. F., Disquisitiones generales circa superficies curvas (1827)
Gauss, K. F., General investigations of curved surfaces, English translation. Hewlett, New York: Raven Press (1965).
Banchoff, T., Gaffney T., McCrory C., Cusps of Gauss Mappings, (1982) Research Notes in Mathematics 55, Pitman, London. online version 
Koenderink, J. J., Solid Shape, MIT Press (1990)

External links 
 
 

Differential geometry
Differential geometry of surfaces
Riemannian geometry
Surfaces
Carl Friedrich Gauss